The cut-elimination theorem (or Gentzen's Hauptsatz) is the central result establishing the significance of the sequent calculus.  It was originally proved by Gerhard Gentzen in his landmark 1934 paper "Investigations in Logical Deduction" for the systems LJ and LK formalising intuitionistic and classical logic respectively.  The cut-elimination theorem states that any judgement that possesses a proof in the sequent calculus making use of the cut rule also possesses a cut-free proof, that is, a proof that does not make use of the cut rule.

The cut rule
Note that the left-hand side (LHS) is a conjunction (and) and the right-hand side (RHS)  is a disjunction (or).  

The LHS may have arbitrarily many or few formulae; when the LHS is empty, the RHS is a tautology.  In LK, the RHS may also have any number of formulae—if it has none, the LHS is a contradiction, whereas in LJ the RHS may only have one formula or none: here we see that allowing more than one formula in the RHS is equivalent, in the presence of the right contraction rule, to the admissibility of the law of the excluded middle.  However, the sequent calculus is a fairly expressive framework, and there have been sequent calculi for intuitionistic logic proposed that allow many formulae in the RHS. From Jean-Yves Girard's logic LC it is easy to obtain a rather natural formalisation of classical logic where the RHS contains at most one formula; it is the interplay of the logical and structural rules that is the key here.

"Cut" is a rule in the normal statement of the sequent calculus, and equivalent to a variety of rules in other proof theories, which, given

and 

allows one to infer

That is, it "cuts" the occurrences of the formula  out of the inferential relation.

Cut elimination
The cut-elimination theorem states that (for a given system) any sequent provable using the rule Cut can be proved without use of this rule.

For sequent calculi that have only one formula in the RHS, the "Cut" rule reads, given

and 

allows one to infer

Consequently, the cut rule is admissible.

Consequences of the theorem

For systems formulated in the sequent calculus, analytic proofs are those proofs that do not use Cut. Typically such a proof will be longer, of course, and not necessarily trivially so. In his essay "Don't Eliminate Cut!" George Boolos demonstrated that there was a derivation that could be completed in a page using cut, but whose analytic proof could not be completed in the lifespan of the universe.

The theorem has many, rich consequences:
 A system is inconsistent if it admits a proof of the absurd. If the system has a cut elimination theorem, then if it has a proof of the absurd, or of the empty sequent,  it should also have a proof of the absurd (or   the empty sequent), without cuts. It is typically very easy  to check that there are no such proofs. Thus, once a system is shown to have a cut elimination theorem, it is normally immediate that the system is consistent.
 Normally also the system has, at least in first order logic,  the subformula property, an important property in several approaches to proof-theoretic semantics.

Cut elimination is one of the most powerful tools for proving interpolation theorems.  The possibility of carrying out proof search based on resolution, the essential insight leading to the Prolog programming language, depends upon the admissibility of Cut in the appropriate system.

For proof systems based on  higher-order typed lambda calculus through a Curry–Howard isomorphism, cut elimination algorithms correspond to the strong normalization property (every proof term reduces in a finite number of steps into a normal form).

See also 
 Deduction theorem
 Gentzen's consistency proof for Peano's axioms

Notes

References 
 
 
 
  Untersuchungen über das logische Schließen I 
  Untersuchungen über das logische Schließen II

External links 
 
 

Theorems in the foundations of mathematics
Proof theory